Victor Kaj Edvardsen (born 14 January 1996) is a Swedish professional footballer who plays as a striker for Allsvenskan club Djurgårdens IF.

Club career 
In 2022, Edvardsen joined Djurgårdens IF.

International career 
Edvardsen made his full international debut for Sweden on 12 January 2023 in a friendly 2–1 win against Iceland, playing for 63 minutes before being replaced by Omar Faraj.

Career statistics

International

References

External links
 
 

1996 births
Living people
Swedish footballers
Association football forwards
IFK Göteborg players
Utsiktens BK players
Elverum Fotball players
IK Oddevold players
Karlstad BK players
Degerfors IF players
Ettan Fotboll players
Superettan players
Allsvenskan players
Swedish expatriate footballers
Expatriate footballers in Norway
Swedish expatriate sportspeople in Norway
Footballers from Gothenburg